Eupromus is a genus of longhorn beetles of the subfamily Lamiinae, containing the following species:

 Eupromus laosensis Breuning, 1968
 Eupromus nigrovittatus Pic, 1930
 Eupromus ruber (Dalman, 1817)
 Eupromus simeco Holzschuh, 2013

References

Lamiini